Cheng Xiu (died 1 April 1967) was a Chinese politician. She was among the first group of women elected to the Legislative Yuan in 1948.

Biography
Originally from Duchang County in Jiangxi province, Cheng was the niece of Cheng Tianfang. She obtained an LLD from the Nancy-Université in France, worked at the National Institute for Compilation and Translation and was a professor at National Chung Cheng University. She was a member of the Jiangxi Women's Association and the Jiangxi branch of the Women's Movement Committee.

Cheng was a Kuomintang candidate in Jiangxi province in the 1948 elections for the Legislative Yuan and was elected to parliament. She relocated to Taiwan during the Chinese Civil War, where she remained a member of the Legislative Yuan. In 1956 she was convicted of fraud and sentenced to a year in prison and a loss of civic rights for two years. She appealed to the High Court but lost, resulting in her membership of parliament being cancelled. She died on 1 April 1967.

References

Date of birth unknown
Nancy-Université alumni
Academic staff of Nanchang University
20th-century Chinese women politicians
Members of the Kuomintang
Members of the 1st Legislative Yuan
Members of the 1st Legislative Yuan in Taiwan
1967 deaths